Malachi Davis (born September 13, 1977, in Sacramento, California) is a sprinter who competed in the 2004 Summer Olympic Games, representing Great Britain. Davis placed 5th in the finals for the  relay team. He competed in two Olympic events in 2004, and in the World Championships for his relay teams in 2005. After the Olympics, Davis and fellow 2004 Gold medalist Joanna Hayes formed Formula Gold, a sports performance company inspired by Olympic training methods and workouts. Today, Davis serves as the creative director and CEO for Formula Gold, where he does fitness consultant work for all major sports associations (the MLB, NFL, NBA and ATP) in addition to creating physical education curriculums for school districts throughout the state of California.

Early life and college 
Davis was born in Sacramento, California and raised in Davis, California. The middle of four children, he has two twin sisters and an older brother. Davis was first exposed to athletics at the early age of seven. Davis's mother entered his brother into a nationwide track meet, the Hershey Invitational, which was recruiting the best athletes from each state to compete. Davis accompanied his mother to watch the race, when she told him moments before the competition that she had entered him as well. From that first race forward, he competed and won every local track event, even qualifying for the state nationals.

In high school, Davis held the record in the 400m and 200m, which made him eligible for the state championships. From there, he attended Sacramento City College, where he became the state champion in the 400m and 4x4 relay. Davis was inducted into the Sacramento City College Hall of Fame in 2017.

From Sacramento City College, Davis attended the University of California, Los Angeles (UCLA) on a full scholarship, where he became an All-American NCAA champion. He competed in the  relay split, in addition to the  indoor record teams. Today, Davis is featured on UCLA's Wall of Fame at Drake Stadium for his track and field accomplishments.

Professional career

2004 Athens Summer Olympics  

The highlight of Davis's athletic career came in 2004, when he competed in the 2004 Summer Olympics in Athens, Greece after being recruited by the British Athletic Confederation. While Davis is American, he represented his mother's native country of Great Britain, where he competed in two Olympic events. He qualified for the 400m and the  relay. He was eliminated in the rounds of the 400m, but placed 5th for the  relay team.

Following the Olympic Games, Davis was runner-up in the UK trials and competed in the 2005 World Athletics Championships in the 400m and the  relay. While he was eliminated in the 400m, Davis made it to the finals of the  team, placing 4th (2:58:82) in the relay split 44.3 anchor leg.

2005-Today 
After the Olympic Games Davis focused on his sports performance company, Formula Gold. His Olympic-style training programs combine swimming, running, balance and gymnastics, with levels ranging from amateur to professional athlete. Davis, who serves as the creative director of Formula Gold, also works closely with retired New York Yankees star, Alex Rodriguez. Davis designed Rodriguez's fitness regimen for his New York Yankees comeback in 2015, after the MLB star's year-long hiatus. Thanks to Davis's rigorous training program, Rodriguez had one of the best years of his athletic career. Davis served as the MLB star's trainer for the last two years of his New York Yankees contract, and now oversees the fitness division of Rodriguez's company, A-Rod Corp. Through A-Rod Corp, Davis does consultant work for fitness facilities.

Achievements
During his adolescent years, Davis was a 2X State Qualifier in the 400m. In 2004 Davis competed in the Summer Olympics for Great Britain, making it to the finals where he placed 5th for the relay team. Following the Olympic Games, he competed in the World Athletics Championships, where he placed 4th in the relay split anchor leg. Post Olympics, Davis starred in numerous athletic commercials for Nike, Adidas and Yahoo, in addition to snagging a feature in Runners World Magazine.

Philanthropy 
In 2003, Davis helped design after-school athletic curriculums for youth in the inner cities as part of Arnold Schwarzenegger's program, After-School All-Stars.

In 2012, Davis joined the Real Medicine Foundation where he worked on the L.A. Marathon campaign, raising awareness for people living in disaster-stricken areas across the world. Through the foundation, he provided those in need with medical and physical support.

References

External links
 UCLA profile
 BBC article on Davis selection
 Formula Gold

Living people
1977 births
British male sprinters
Track and field athletes from Sacramento, California
Athletes (track and field) at the 2004 Summer Olympics
Olympic athletes of Great Britain
Davis Senior High School (California) alumni